Brahmanagudem is a village in East Godavari district of the Indian state of Andhra Pradesh. It is located in Chagallu mandal. Brahmanagudem (BMGM) has its own railway station.

Demographics 

 Census of India, Brahmanagudem had a population of 5499. The total population constitute, 2742 males and 2757 females with a sex ratio of 1005 females per 1000 males. 536 children are in the age group of 0–6 years, with sex ratio of 881. The average literacy rate stands at 75.78%.

References

Villages in West Godavari district